An underwater panther, called  or  in Ojibwe, is one of the most important of several mythical water beings among many Indigenous peoples of the Northeastern Woodlands and Great Lakes region, particularly among the Anishinaabe.

 translates into "the Great Lynx". It has the head and paws of a giant cat but is covered in scales and has dagger-like spikes running along its back and tail. Mishipeshu calls Michipicoten Island in Lake Superior his home and is a powerful creature in the mythological traditions of some Indigenous North American tribes, particularly Anishinaabe, the Odawa, Ojibwe, and Potawatomi, of the Great Lakes region of Canada and the United States. In addition to the Anishinaabeg, Innu also have Mishibizhiw stories.

To the Algonquins, the underwater panther was the most powerful underworld being. The Ojibwe traditionally held them to be masters of all water creatures, including snakes. Some versions of the Nanabozho creation legend refers to whole communities of water lynx.

Some archaeologists believe that underwater panthers were major components of the Southeastern Ceremonial Complex of the Mississippian culture in the prehistoric American Southeast.

Name
However, it is also commonly referred to as the "Great underground wildcat" or "Great under-water wildcat." It is the most important of the underwater animals for the Ojibwa.

Description

In mythologies of the indigenous peoples of the Great Lakes, underwater panthers are described as water monsters that live in opposition to the Thunderbirds, masters of the powers of the air. Underwater Panthers are seen as an opposing yet complementary force to the Thunderbirds, and they are engaged in eternal conflict.

The underwater panther was an amalgam of parts from many animals: the body of a wild feline, often a cougar or lynx; the horns of deer or bison; upright scales on its back; occasionally feathers; and parts from other animals as well, depending on the particular myth. Underwater panthers are represented with exceptionally long tails, occasionally with serpentine properties. The creatures are thought to roar or hiss in the sounds of storms or rushing rapids.

 were said to live in the deepest parts of lakes and rivers, where they can cause storms. Some traditions believed the underwater panthers to be helpful, protective creatures, but more often they were viewed as malevolent beasts that brought death and misfortune. They often need to be placated for safe passage across a lake. As late as the 1950s, the Prairie Band of Potawatomi Indians performed a traditional ceremony to placate the Underwater Panther and maintain balance with the Thunderbird.

When ethnographer Johann Georg Kohl visited the United States in the 1850s, he spoke with a Fond du Lac chief, who showed Kohl a piece of copper kept in his medicine bag.

Copper
 is known for guarding the vast amounts of copper in Lake Superior and the Great Lakes Region. Indigenous people mined copper long before the arrival of Europeans to the area.  Later, during the 17th century, missionaries of the Society of Jesus arrived in the Great Lakes Region. By that time, taking copper from the region was extremely taboo and forbidden by the Ojibwe tribe. It was even worse to take it from the Great Lynx's home, Michipicoten Island; this was considered to be stealing from Mishipeshu himself.

Purported encounters
There are a few stories of encounters with this great beast. The very second they pushed off and backed into the water with their canoe, the eerie voice of the water panther surrounded them. The water panther came growling after them, vigorously accusing them of stealing the playthings of his children. All four of the people died on the way back to their village, the last one surviving just long enough to tell the tale of what had happened in his final moments before he died.

Depictions in art

The underwater panther is well represented in pictograms. Historical Anishnaabe twined and quilled men's bags often feature an underwater panther on one panel and the Thunderbird on the other. Norval Morrisseau (Ojibwe) painted underwater panthers in his Woodlands style artworks, contemporary paintings based on Ojibwe oral history and cosmology.  The emblem has been embellished, and appears as a decorative motif on muskets.

The Canadian Museum of History includes an underwater panther in its coat of arms.

In 2003, archaeologist Brad Lepper suggested that the Alligator Effigy Mound in Granville, Ohio, represents the underwater panther. Lepper posits that early European settlers, when learning from Native Americans that the mound represented a fierce creature that lived in the water and ate people, mistakenly assumed that the Native Americans were referring to an alligator.

In popular culture
The Grimm episode "Mishipeshu" involves the possession of a young Native American by an underwater panther.

See also
 Anishinaabe traditional beliefs
 Nguruvilu
 Piasa
 Horned Serpent
 Southeastern Ceremonial Complex
 Bunyip

References

Further reading

External links

 American Museum of Natural History on Mishepishu
 Odawa twined bag with images of the Underwater Panther, NMAI

Anishinaabe mythology
Ojibwe legendary creatures
Algonquian legendary creatures
Lake Superior
Legendary creatures of the indigenous peoples of North America
Mythological felines
Mythological hybrids
Great Lakes tribal culture
Native American religion
Supernatural legends
Water deities